Seriously, Dude, I'm Gay is an unaired American reality television special planned for broadcast by the Fox Broadcasting Company (Fox). A two-hour special was set to premiere on June 7, 2004, although the special was abruptly removed from the Fox schedule only eleven days before its planned broadcast. Filmed in West Hollywood, California, the special depicted two straight men in competition for a $50,000 reward over who could pass themselves off as a more convincing gay man. The contestants were required to move into separate lofts with gay roommates, come out to their best friends, and socialize at gay nightclubs, in addition to competing in a variety of daily challenges. Irish television presenter Amanda Byram was set to host the special.

Seriously, Dude, I'm Gay was a part of Fox's intent to capitalize on a rising interest in LGBT-themed reality television shows. The special, however, was met with fierce criticism from advocacy groups, such as the media monitoring organization GLAAD, who claimed it promoted a negative portrayal of gay men. The special's press release also received backlash, particularly a line that described the special's premise as "a heterosexual male’s worst nightmare: turning gay overnight". On May 27, 2004, Fox shelved the special, citing creative reasons. The special's cancellation influenced other television networks to reach out to GLAAD for review of their own LGBT-themed television shows. In 2005, Seriously, Dude, I'm Gay was one of several television programs cited in a class-action lawsuit filed by the Writers Guild of America concerning labor law violations.

Format

Set in West Hollywood, the two-hour special depicted two straight men—a 22-year-old student from Florida and a 28-year-old salesman from Massachusetts—in competition for a reward of $50,000. In order to win the reward, the men were required to pass themselves off as gay for a week and immerse themselves in gay culture. The men were required to move into separate lofts with gay roommates, come out to their best friends, and socialize at gay nightclubs. The contestants also competed in daily challenges; challenges included swimsuit modeling for a group of gay men, confiding in a former teammate that the contestant wrestled due to enjoyment of "close contact with sweaty boys", fork-feeding dinner to a blind date and convincing the date to spank them, making a "gay face", and naming a favorite male pornographic film actor. The contestants were each assigned three coaches (referred to as "mantors") that guided them in experiencing "life as a gay man". At the end of the week, the two men were judged by a diverse panel of gay men who had previously been told that only one of the contestants were actually gay. Whichever contestant the panel chose as the more convincing gay man received the reward. Irish television presenter Amanda Byram was set to host the special.

Announcement and reception
On May 13, 2004, Fox sent out a press release for Seriously, Dude, I'm Gay. Set to air on June 7, 2004, the release described the special's premise as "a heterosexual male’s worst nightmare: turning gay overnight". The release also specified that the winner of the special would be selected by a "jury of their queers". The release quickly drew criticism from television critics, with Lisa de Moraes of The Washington Post referring to it as homophobic. Production company World of Wonder, who specializes in LGBT programming, referred to the special as a "potential problem" that exploits gay men. Four hours after the release went out, Fox distributed another press release that omitted both of these lines. The network also issued an apology, in which it referred to the content of the initial release as a "failed attempt at humor". The special's announcement followed a rising interest in LGBT-themed reality television shows.

Seriously, Dude, I'm Gay drew sharp criticism from advocacy groups, including the media monitoring organization GLAAD. Fox provided GLAAD with an advance copy of the special; upon review, the organization condemned it as "an exercise in systematic humiliation". The organization specifically cited dialogue in which the contestants described their experiences as their "worst nightmare" and being "trapped in gay hell". The organization further criticized the special's general premise, in which they claimed it was offensive and could potentially increase violence against gay people. GLAAD's entertainment media director, Stephen Macias, further claimed that the special embodied "ludicrously sophomoric notions of what it is to be gay". In addition to the special's content, the organization also criticized the language used in its press release, specifically the line that described a panel of gay men as a "jury of their queers".

In response to GLAAD's comments about Seriously, Dude, I'm Gay, several of the special's producers and actors—many of whom were gay themselves—voiced their own criticism toward the organization. Creative consultant Christian McLaughlin accused GLAAD of attempted censorship. He commented, "Our primary purpose was to be funny, but if people actually got to see the show, they would probably be more tolerant of gay people in the future." Executive producer Ray Giuliani described the special as a "joke" and stated that GLAAD's belief that the special would cause harm to gay people was baseless. Under the impression that both contestants were homophobic, Giuliani further explained that the producers intended for the contestants to have "walked away learning something about what it feels like to be a gay man in the middle of a straight world". Larry Anderson, one of the two contestants, claimed that the special helped him conquer his own homophobia, adding that he had many meaningful interactions amongst himself and his coaches. Jackie Beat, a drag performer and one of the coaches, criticized GLAAD's stance on the special and claimed that it did not portray gay people in a negative manner. Byram similarly expressed her disappointment with the negative reception the special garnered, in which she claimed that "TV and the FCC [are] very sensitive right now".

Cancellation
On May 27, 2004, Fox announced that it had shelved the special for creative reasons, in which a spokesperson stated, "[The network] looked at it, and creatively it was not where we felt like it should be". This announcement came only hours after a meeting was scheduled between GLAAD and Fox's entertainment president Gail Berman, in which GLAAD planned to voice their concerns about the special's portrayal of gay men. According to The Advocate, an "inside source" at Fox claimed the cancellation of the special was additionally a result of Fox executives "believ[ing] the gay reality phenomenon was on the wane" due to the underperformance of Playing It Straight and Queer Eye for the Straight Guy. Following its cancellation, Seriously, Dude, I'm Gay was replaced on the Fox schedule with a telecasting of American Pie 2. Giuliani largely attributed the special's cancellation to pressures Fox faced from GLAAD, however, Beat claimed that the network was unenthusiastic about the program in general. In response to the cancellation, GLAAD commended Fox for "doing the right thing" and being responsive to the organization's concerns. One of the contestants, Larry Anderson, subsequently did a photo spread for The Advocate; the magazine interviewed Anderson, several of the special's producers, and a representative from GLAAD.

The controversy and subsequent cancellation of Seriously, Dude, I'm Gay prompted the executive producers of the TBS series He's a Lady to reach out to GLAAD for review of their own program. Douglas Ross and Tommy Campbell claimed that they did not want to offend transgender people with He's a Lady, which depicted a competition between eleven men who received feminine makeovers and participated in weekly gender-specific challenges. Campbell explained: "We had heard about Seriously, Dude, I'm Gay and how it was controversial. We went to GLAAD to get their support and to show that this was a kind show." Despite this claim, GLAAD alleged that they were the ones to reach out to the producers after seeing a press release for the series. As a result of their consultation with GLAAD, Campbell stated that the organization helped the producers to "become more aware of transgender issues and the double standards of beauty". The cancellation of Seriously, Dude, I'm Gay also resulted in Fox organizing a meeting with GLAAD to discuss and improve the network's on-air representations of the LGBT community.

Lawsuit
On August 23, 2005, Seriously, Dude, I'm Gay was one of several television programs cited in a class-action lawsuit filed by the Writers Guild of America. Known as Shriver v. Rocket Science Laboratories, the suit was filed in the Los Angeles County Superior Court and targeted the special's production company, Rocket Science Laboratories, alongside the special's network, Fox. The plaintiffs in the suit included writers and editors of the special who alleged violations of the California Labor Code. The employees claimed that the two companies violated labor laws in relation to overtime, wages, and meal periods. More specifically, the plaintiffs alleged that the companies forced employees to falsify time cards in order to be paid a flat weekly rate, despite the employees actually working nearly 80 hours a week with no meal breaks. In 2009, a settlement was reached between the two parties for $2.57 million, although Rocket Science Laboratories and Fox continued to deny all liability. Speaking on the settlement, Emma Leheny, an attorney for the plaintiffs, stated, "I'd like to say as a plaintiff's attorney that I cured cancer, that this case brought these violations to an end. But we know they still go on."

See also
 List of television series canceled before airing an episode

References

Sources

External links
 

2004 television specials
Fox television specials
LGBT-related controversies in television
LGBT-related television specials
Television controversies in the United States
Television series by Rocket Science Laboratories
Unaired television shows